Zhejiang Television (ZJTV) is a satellite television channel owned by Zhejiang Radio and Television Group serving Zhejiang Province. It was launched on October 1, 1960.

History
January 1, 1994, Zhejiang TV program first started to use satellites, call "Zhejiang TV", effectively covering the whole country and more than and 40 countries and regions around 2 billion of the population, and more than 95% of the national cable television broadcast, has a relatively fixed audience of one hundred and fifty million, of which about one hundred million for the city audience. In the early days, most of the programs of Zhejiang satellite TV were mainly to promote the Jiangnan culture and analyze the economic development model of Jiangnan, especially in the production of news programs.

In 1999, Zhejiang satellite TV broadcast system is proposed to reconstruct the entire news, through a lot of research and study, the positioning system of Zhejiang TV news in the digital and network news broadcast taping on the combination of centralized management, put forward the news resources, as well as a variety of news broadcast mode for the future.

In 2000, Zhejiang satellite TV cultural interview program, "an exclusive interview" launched.

2003, Zhejiang satellite TV channel operation began. Through the establishment of marketing center integrated channel management, the establishment of a large event group planning major events.

In 2004, Zhejiang satellite TV to determine the "entertainment wealth," the theme of the positioning, the introduction of "entertainment wealth" and "the world of Zhejiang" two column.

In 2005, Zhejiang satellite TV "seven southern" scheme, introducing seven television producer and presenter, set up seven TV production team, to build seven evening programs or activities, purchased 6 "4+1" mode of independent radio drama and broadcast at the end of the year.

In 2006, Zhejiang satellite TV news programs in addition to play in making the advantage to continue to become bigger and stronger in the news programs, variety show production continues to rise, launched own entertainment hits, such as "talk show" too coke, "boys and girls" location dating show, variety sports show "odd" won victory. Entertainment to take shape.

In 2007, Zhejiang satellite TV in the program into the concept of modern human culture, highlighting the value of the humanities and the value of wealth, entertainment and humanities as the main body.  in the same year, with the help of singing variety show "I love the lyrics in mind" the founder of "Mic King City showdown".  in the same year, launched the "Olympic dream", "boy really action", "citizen", "College Music Festival, one of the three women play", "love story", "too coke", "boys and girls", "fans arena" and other original columns.

2008, I love to remember the lyrics and its derivative program "love to sing will win", as well as interactive music program, I am the judges, to build a variety of three musketeers". live May 17, "Wenchuan - the people of Zhejiang to support the Sichuan earthquake special party to the scene".  on August 25, the channel was revised to establish the China blue channel positioning.

January 24, 2009, Zhejiang TV entertainment program, I am the judges on the screen.

July 2010, Zhejiang TV music talent show "extraordinary" launch.

On April 2, 2011, the civilian dream variety show "China dream show" (the first quarter) launched. On March 25, the news action to the blue ocean in the Gulf of Hangzhou start.

2012, Zhejiang satellite TV established the first dream channel slogan. July 13, inspirational music commentary program "China good voice" (the first quarter) launched. September 1, held "five anniversary to let the dream fly" Gala party, Taiwan Song "dream of the sky is especially blue" officially released.

January 12, 2013, Zhejiang satellite TV dating program turned to meet TA launch.  in the same year, parent-child program "the first time in life" launch.  in October, the introduction of the quiz show who dares to stand out.

January 2014, Zhejiang satellite TV held the first China blue TV original model contest".August, Zhejiang TV advertising revenue soared from 600 million to 4 billion 800 million, an increase of 7.5 times, ranking the top in the country from the top three in the top ninth. on July 17, the introduction of a father and son role exchange program, dad answered it. on August 1, the introduction of cultural programs, the Chinese good story. on September 22, launched the watch Phoenix special live.  October 10, the outdoor reality show "Running Man" (Season 1).

January 2015, Zhejiang satellite TV to create a humane program, "so it is". August, China blue seven anniversary, advertising revenue exceeded 8 billion 500 million. November 25, the original class to develop the program, burning young! Premiere.

On January 22, 2016, Zhejiang satellite TV series suspense outdoor reality show "twenty-four hours" (first quarter) launch, January 29, launched the indoor athletic reality show "the negotiator" (first quarter),  July 15, inspirational music review program "Chinese song sound" (first quarter) launch, August 2, Zhejiang satellite TV in Macao through Macao cable television 159th broadcast, August 8, to launch sports variety show "China champion fan", the show is Zhejiang TV for Rio Olympics program. August 29, jointly with the Sun Media Group launched the G20 summit in Hangzhou special program "G20" interview with Yang Lan - the meeting of wind and clouds. September 10, the introduction of comedy reality show comedy comedy launch. November 4, the music challenge program, the voice of the dream.  December 10, the light comedy reality show "the food delicacy in the embarrassed way" launched. December 30, live "love together" lead 2017 concert.

In 2017, Zhejiang satellite TV and calmly making CO produced reality show to develop their music "is born and I", and in February boot, 22:00 was formally launched in late April 1.  April 1"the youth inspirational growth" show high energy Youth Group officially launched.

In 2021, for "Star Chaser," Zhejiang TV assembled a cast of young celebrities including L'Oréal brand ambassador Zhu Yilong and noted Lamborghini crasher Li Yifeng for a camping-themed reality show that sees a rotating set of guests join the hosts as they visit six scenic spots around China.

Programs
 The Voice of China
 Sing! China

References

External links
Official Site 

Television networks in China
Mass media in Zhejiang
Television channels and stations established in 1960
1960 establishments in China
Mass media in Hangzhou
Television in China